A Christmas Gift of Love was the second Christmas-themed album by singer-songwriter Barry Manilow released in 2002. The album went Gold in the United States. It was done with Columbia Records instead of his usual label of Concord Records. However, as part of the agreement with Concord, the logo of both labels appear on this release.

Track listing

Certifications

References

2002 Christmas albums
Christmas albums by American artists
Pop Christmas albums
Barry Manilow albums
Columbia Records Christmas albums
Albums recorded at Capitol Studios